Matkatpur (also called Matkadpur) is a village in Kharagpur I CD Block in Kharagpur subdivision of Paschim Medinipur district in the state of West Bengal, India.

Demographics
As per 2011 Census of India Matkadpur had a total population of 1,895 of which 958 (51%) were males and 937 (49%) were females. Population below 6 years was 183. The total number of literates in Matkadpur was 1,296 (68.39% of the population over 6 years).

Transport
NH 14, (old numbering NH 60), running from Morgram to Kharagpur, passes through Matkatpur.

References

Villages in Paschim Medinipur district